The discography of Bret Michaels consists of 4 studio albums, 1 soundtrack album, 4 compilation albums, 2 EPs and 29 singles.

Bret Michaels first gained fame as the lead vocalist of the glam metal band Poison who have sold over 45 million records worldwide and 15 million records in the United States alone. The band has also charted ten singles to the Top 40 of the Billboard Hot 100, including six Top 10 singles and the number-one single, "Every Rose Has Its Thorn".

Besides his career as lead singer, he has several solo albums to his credit, including the soundtrack album to the movie A Letter from Death Row in which Michaels starred, wrote and directed in 1998, and a classic Poison-style rock album, Songs of Life, in 2003. Michaels has appeared in several movies and TV shows, including as a judge on the talent show Nashville Star which led to his country influenced rock album Freedom of Sound in 2005. He starred in the hit VH1 reality show Rock of Love with Bret Michaels and its sequels, which inspired his successful solo album Rock My World. He was also the winning contestant on NBC's reality show Celebrity Apprentice 3 and also featured in his own reality docu-series Bret Michaels: Life As I Know It, which inspired his highest charting album as a solo artist, Custom Built, reaching No. 1 on Billboard's Hard Rock list. He is also known for hosting on the Travel Channel. In 2006, Hit Parader ranked Michaels at #40 on their list of greatest Heavy metal singers of all-time.

Studio albums

Soundtrack albums

Compilation albums

Extended plays

Singles

Guest singles

Filmography

Music videos

With Poison

Studio albums
Look What the Cat Dragged In (1986)
Open Up and Say... Ahh! (1988)
Flesh & Blood (1990)
Native Tongue (1993)
Crack a Smile... and More! (2000) 
Hollyweird (2002)
Poison'd! (2007)

References

External links
 Official website

Heavy metal discographies
Discographies of American artists